Abutia, also: Abutia Area, is a Kingdom in West Africa, in the East of the Republic of Ghana, Volta Region.

History 
Abutia is a traditional area in Ghana with Teti, Agorve and Kloe as its three (3) main towns.

In colonial time Abutia was part of Togoland as German Colony from 1884 to 1916 and British Colony from 1916 to 1945.
When Ghana gained independence on 6 March 1957, Abutia became part of the Republic of Ghana.

In 1992 the parliament enacted the new constitution of the Republic of Ghana, in which the traditional areas got cultural sovereignty (subnational monarchy). In 2008 a special decree of the chieftaincy was established.

Since 1998 the Togbe (King) and traditional ruler is Togbe Abutia Kodzo Gidi V.

Geography and Territory 
The traditional national territory of Abutia is located between latitudes 6.33˚ 3ˈ N and 6.93˚ 6ˈ N and longitudes 0.17˚ 4ˈ E and 0.53˚ 39ˈ E. It shares boundaries with the Afadjato area to the North, the Adaklu District to the South, South Dayi District to the West, Ho Municipal and the Republic of Togo to the East.

It has a total land area of 1.002,79 km².

Regions and Towns 

Today's towns and villages of Abutia are:

 Agbagyi
 Agorve
 Aframkope
 Agric
 Amesinyakope
 Anyinawasi
 Argordeke
 Avetakpo
 Awakpeta
 Bator
 Buluonyibe
 Dalor
 Dangbe
 Dzanyodake
 Forsime
 Gbetekpo
 Gbetekpomanu
 Hlorve
 Kissifli
 Kloe
 Kpeteho
 Kpogadzi
 Kpolukope
 Kpota
 Kwanta Awudomi
 Togbave
 Tedeafenu
 Tedeafenu-Volo
 Tegbleve
 Teti
 Tsauvenu
 Tsili (Kyito)
 Megame 
 Norris
 Noanyikbe
 Sebekope 
 Vohu
 Wodome

National park 

The Kalakpa Resource Reserve is the famous national park in Abutia, Ghana. It is located in the South-East of the Abutia Hills Forest Reserve between 6°18' and 6°28' N and 0°17' and 0°30' E and in the Abutia and Adaklu traditional areas. The Kalakpa River divides the Abutia land from the Adaklu land. The Reserve covers an area of about 325 km² square of forest/savanna transition zone, and the dominant vegetation is the dry Borassus-Combretum woodland.

See also
 State Institute of Science and Education (Abutia)
 History of Ghana
 Orders, decorations, and medals of Ghana

References

 
Sub-regions of Ghana
Ghana monarchies
Ethnic groups in Ghana